Aslacton Mill is a Grade II listed tower mill at Aslacton, Norfolk, England which is derelict.

History
Aslacton Mill was probably built in 1834, although there was a mill in Aslacton as early as 1751. Benjamin Gibson is the first recorded miller and the mill was owned by Barnabas Burroughes from 1872 until his death on 18 December 1899. The mill passed to his widow and after her death on 4 August 1903, the mill was offered for sale by auction at the Railway Inn, Tivetshall on 25 August 1903.  The top bid of £350 was below the reserve price, so the mill remained unsold. The mill was sold in October 1903 to Samuel Fickling. He died in March 1913, leaving the mill to his widow. On her death in May 1915 the mill passed to their son Arthur Robinson Fickling, who sold it to Selina Herring in October 1915 for £400. The mill was sold to John Colchester in 1929. The sails were removed c1930 and the mill worked by steam engine. Colchester worked the mill by steam engine, and then an oil engine, until 1938. The derelict tower still stands, containing some machinery.

Description

Aslacton mill is a four storey tower mill which had a boat shaped cap winded by a six bladed fantail. It had four double Patent sails and drove two pairs of millstones. Unusually, these were driven overdrift by wind and  underdrift by engine. The upright shaft and great spur wheel for the engine drive remain in situ.

Millers
Benjamin Gibson 1841-68
Barnabas Borroughes 1872-98
Jane Burroughes 1900
George Leonard Smith 1900-01
Robert William Drane 1904-08
William Samuel Herring 1912
Selina Herring 1915-16
Charles William Herring 1922-28
John Corben Colchester 1929-38
Samuel McMeakin 1937

Reference for above:-

References

External links
Windmill World webpage on Aslacton Mill.

Windmills in Norfolk
Tower mills in the United Kingdom
Grinding mills in the United Kingdom
Windmills completed in 1834
Grade II listed buildings in Norfolk
Grade II listed windmills
Towers completed in 1834